Hashcheh-ye Sofla (also Romanized as Ḩashcheh-ye Soflá, Hashcheh-ye Soflá; also known as Ḩashcheh, Ḩashcheh-ye Pā’īn, Hashjeh-ye Soflá, Ḩaskeh, and Hastcha) is a village in Jarahi Rural District, in the Central District of Mahshahr County, Khuzestan Province, Iran. At the 2006 census, its population was 784, in 150 families.

References 

Populated places in Mahshahr County